Thiru Krishnamoorthy (born 6 July 1979) is an Indian film director and screenwriter who works in Tamil cinema. He has directed films such as Theeradha Vilaiyattu Pillai (2010), Samar (2013) and Naan Sigappu Manithan (2014).

Early life

Career
After assisting A. Rajasekhar in Sathyam (2008), Thiru made his directorial debut with Theeradha Vilaiyattu Pillai (2010) starring Vishal alongside three lead actresses. The film received mixed reviews and became hit in the box office. After that Thiru again collaborated with Vishal in two films Samar (2013) and Naan Sigappu Manithan (2014). The former dealt with protagonist who unknowingly involved in a dangerous game and the latter dealt with hero suffering from narcolepsy.

In late 2015, Thiru announced a project titled Garuda featuring Vikram and Kajal Aggarwal in the lead roles. The film was set to be produced by Silverline Film Factory and have music composer Girinandh, but the collaboration was later called off.

Personal life
He married Kani Thiru, daughter of film director Agathiyan. The couple have two daughters, Diya and Tashmai.

Filmography

Films

Webseries
Jhansi (Telugu, Hotstar)

References

Living people
20th-century Indian film directors
Tamil-language film directors
1979 births